Dražen Perković (born 16 March 1963) is a Croatian taekwondo practitioner. He competed in the men's featherweight at the 1988 Summer Olympics.

References

External links
 
 
 

1963 births
Living people
Sportspeople from Karlovac
Croatian male taekwondo practitioners
Olympic taekwondo practitioners of Croatia
Taekwondo practitioners at the 1988 Summer Olympics